The name USS K-1 may refer to the following ships of the United States Navy:

 , the lead vessel of the K-class submarines, originally named Haddock
 , the lead vessel of the Barracuda-class  submarines, later renamed Barracuda

United States Navy ship names